William Scott Prady (born June 7, 1960) is an American television writer and producer who has worked on American sitcoms and variety programs, including Married... with Children, Dream On, Star Trek: Voyager, Dharma & Greg, Two and a Half Men and Gilmore Girls and is the co-creator of The Big Bang Theory and The Muppets.

Early life
Born in Detroit, Prady graduated from Cranbrook Schools in Bloomfield Hills, Michigan and attended Wayne State University in Detroit, Michigan. He began his broadcast writing career with four episodes of You Can't Do That on Television (shared credit with Terence Taylor) in the early 1980s.

Joining Jim Henson Productions, he was a production assistant on a TV special about the world of technology. Prady stayed with the company and worked in the merchandising department.  With the encouragement of Jim Henson, Prady began writing working on projects ranging from the animated version of Jim Henson's Fraggle Rock to The Jim Henson Hour. During his tenure at The Muppets, he was visually caricatured as the puppet "Chip" (The Jim Henson Hour).  In 1991, Prady was nominated for an Emmy award for co-writing the posthumous tribute to Jim Henson entitled "The Muppets Celebrate Jim Henson". He wrote the Disney theme park attractions Muppet*Vision 3D and Honey, I Shrunk the Audience.

On April 3, 2015, he co-wrote and sold a new version of Muppet Show with the working title The Muppets to ABC with Bob Kushell, who also served as show runner.

His first staff writing job was on the HBO series Dream On in 1995. In 1997 he joined the writing staff of Dharma & Greg, rising to Executive Producer and taking over as Showrunner in 2001. He was also a writer/producer on Good Morning, Miami, Caroline in the City, Related, Platypus Man and Gilmore Girls.

From 2007 to 2019, he was the executive producer and co-creator with Chuck Lorre of the CBS sitcom The Big Bang Theory.

Bill is Jewish.

Educator
As of fall, 2012, Prady is an adjunct faculty member in the School of Cinematic Arts at the University of Southern California.  He is also a Trustee of the Humanitas "New Voices" program.

Personal life
In 2003, he was one of 135 candidates who ran for Governor of California in the 2003 recall election, receiving 474 votes, tying him for 111th place.

Prady was a Z80 programmer at The Small Computer Company.
In 2010, Prady was given honorary membership in the Royal Canadian Institute for the Advancement of Science. In 2015, asteroid 8630 (1981 EY35) was designated 8630 Billprady in his honor.

In 2013, Prady was awarded NASA's Exceptional Public Achievement Medal.

In 2020, Prady appeared in a small cameo role in Bill & Ted Face the Music.

In 2022, Prady was awarded the degree of Doctor of Humane Letters honoris causa by Wayne State University.

Prady is on the autism spectrum.

Selected credits

 Caroline in the City, 1995–1997 (writer, producer)
 Dharma & Greg, 1997–2002 (writer, executive producer)
 Gilmore Girls, 2004–2005 (writer, co-executive producer)
 The Big Bang Theory, 2007–2019 (creator, writer, executive producer)

Awards

References

External links

1960 births
20th-century American Jews
American television writers
American male television writers
Cranbrook Educational Community alumni
Living people
People from Southfield, Michigan
Wayne State University alumni
Showrunners
Screenwriters from Michigan
2020 United States presidential electors
California Democrats
21st-century American Jews
Television producers from Michigan
People on the autism spectrum